Lagos State is a state in southwestern Nigeria. Of the 36 states, it is both the most populous and smallest in area. Bounded to the south by the Bight of Benin and to the west by the international border with Benin, Lagos State borders Ogun State to the northeast making it the only Nigerian state to border only one other state. Named for the city of Lagos—the most populous city in Africa—the state was formed from the Western Region and the former Federal Capital Territory on 27 May 1967.

Geographically, Lagos State is dominated by bodies of water with nearly a quarter of the state's area being bodies of water. The largest of these bodies are the Lagos and Lekki lagoons in the state's interior with the Ogun and Osun rivers flowing into them. Many other rivers and creeks flow throughout the state and serve as vital means of transportation for people and goods. On land, non-urbanized areas are within the tropical Nigerian lowland forests ecoregion with natural areas containing threatened populations of mona monkey, tree pangolin, and hooded vulture along with a transitory population of African bush elephants. Offshore, the state is also biodiverse as there are large fish populations along with African manatees and crocodiles.

Lagos State has been inhabited for years by various indigenous ethnic groups, primarily the majority Yoruba people that live throughout the state but also the Ewe and Ogu peoples in the far west. As a result of migration since the nineteenth century, Lagos State also has large populations of non-native Nigerian ethnic groups with Edo, Fulani, Hausa, Igbo, Ijaw, Ibibio, and Nupe peoples among other Nigerian groups. There are also groups from outside of Nigeria's modern borders with the Saro (Sierra Leonean) and Amaro (Brazilian) groups being descendants of formerly enslaved people that returned to Africa in the 1800s with a longstanding Middle Eastern Nigerian community (mainly Syrian and Lebanese Nigerians) also forming a significant part of Lagos' population along with recent immigrants from Benin Republic, China, Ghana, India, Togo, and the United Kingdom. Religiously, the state is also diverse, as about 55% of the state's population are Christian with around 40% being Muslim and the remaining 5% following traditional ethnic religions or other religions.

In the pre-colonial period, the area that is now Lagos State was mainly fishing villages and ports that at various points were controlled by states including the Oyo Empire and Benin Empire until the early 1800s when the city of Lagos had developed into a major kingdom of its own right. In 1850, the British successfully attacked the kingdom in the Bombardment of Lagos before installing an ally as Oba and signing a treaty that established Lagos as being under British protection. Ten years later, the forced Lagos Treaty of Cession led to the formal establishment of the Lagos Colony. In 1906, the colony was incorporated into the new Southern Nigeria Protectorate which merged into British Nigeria in 1914 with the city of Lagos as its capital. Upon independence in 1960, Lagos remained as the capital with much of the city forming the Federal Capital Territory while the rest of modern-day Lagos State was a part of the Western Region until 1967 when the region was split and the area became Lagos State.

Economically, Lagos State is one of the most important states in the country as a major financial centre and has one of the largest economies in Africa with a gross domestic product of $84 billion comparable with Ghana's $75 billion, Angola's $70 billion, and Ethiopia's $93 billion. Lagos State is also a key culture, education, and transportation hub for Nigeria and Sub-Saharan Africa. Additionally, the state also has the highest literacy rate in Nigeria. Despite overcrowding and chronic debilitating traffic, Lagos State has the highest Human Development Index in Nigeria and numerous developmental projects.

History

Early history
Before the Portuguese name of Lagos had been adopted, Lagos' initial name was   Eko which referred mainly to the Island. The first to settle in Eko were the Aworis in the 15th century and the Binis in the 16th century. The Aworis were conquered by the Benin Empire. The Awori hunters and fishermen had originally come from Ile-Ife to the coast.

It was in 1760 that the name Lagos was adopted by the Portuguese. Naming it after a city in Southern Portugal which was used as port for Slave Trade. In 1861, Oba Docemo was the one who signed the treaty making Lagos a British Colony.

Post-colonial era
Lagos State was created on 27 May 1967 according to the State Creation and Transitional Provisions Decree No. 14 of 1967, which restructured Nigeria into a federation of 12 states. Before the issuance of this Decree, Lagos city, which was the country's capital had been administered directly by the Federal Government through the Federal Ministry of Lagos Affairs. However, Ikeja, Agege, Mushin, Ikorodu, Epe, surulere, and Badagry were administered by the then Western Region Government. Lagos, the city, along with these other towns were captured to create the state of Lagos, with the state becoming fully recognized as a semi-autonomous administrative division on 11 April 1968. Lagos served the dual role of being the State and Federal Capital until 1976 when the capital of the state was moved to Ikeja. After the full establishment of the Federal Capital Territory, based on the recommendation of a of the Akinola Àgùdà–led committee set up by General Murtala Muhammed to review the need for a new capital for Nigeria in 1975. The seat of the Federal Government was formally relocated to Abuja on 12 December 1991. Nevertheless, Lagos remains the financial centre of the country, and even grew to become the most populous city in the state and the country.

Cities and towns

Lagos

Lagos is the most populous city in Lagos State, Nigeria as a whole, and the continent of Africa. The conurbation is one of the most populous in the world. The metropolitan area of Lagos includes Ikeja (which is the capital of Lagos State) and Agege and Mushin.

Ikeja

Ikeja is the state capital of Lagos State. Ikeja is a planned residential and commercial town with shopping malls, pharmacies and government reserved areas. The Murtala Mohammed International Airport is in Ikeja. Ikeja is also home to Fela Kuti's African Shrine, Late Chief Gani Fawehinmi house and Lagbaja's Motherland. It also boasts the largest shopping mall on the mainland.

Lekki

Lekki is a city in the south eastern part of the state. It is a naturally formed peninsula, it is still largely under construction. As of 2015, only phase 1 of the project had been completed, with phase 2 nearing completion. The peninsula is approximately 70 to 80 km long, with an average width of 10 km. Lekki currently houses several estates, gated residential developments, agricultural farmlands, areas allocated for a Free Trade Zone, an airport, and a sea port under construction. The proposed land use master plan for the Lekki envisages the Peninsula as a "Blue-Green Environment City", expected to accommodate over 3.4 million residential population and an additional non-residential population of at least 1.9 million.

Ikorodu

Ikorodu is a city located north east of the state along the Lagos Lagoon. It shares a boundary with Ogun State. As of the 2006 Census Ikorodu had a population of 535,619.it is the third largest city in the south west after Ibadan and Lagos and the 12th largest city in Nigeria. It has an 2022 estimated population of 1,041,066. The population of the city currently grows at 5.26% annually and it is projected to reach 1.7million by 2035

Eko Atlantic

Eko Atlantic is a planned city being constructed on land reclaimed from the Atlantic Ocean. It is located on the former Lagos' Bar Beach. Upon completion, the new island which is still under development is anticipating at least 250,000 residents and a daily flow of at least 150,000 commuters. The development will also have a positive environmental impact; its purpose is to stop the erosion of the Lagos coastline. The Eko Atlantic City project received global recognition in 2009, as the Lagos State government and its private sector partners on the Project, South Energyx, received the Clinton Global Initiative Commitment Certificate.

Badagry

Badagry is a coastal town in the state. It is situated between Metropolitan Lagos, and the border of the Republic of Benin at Seme. As of the preliminary 2006 census results, the municipality had a population of 241,093.
The area is led by a traditional king, Akran De Wheno Aholu Menu – Toyi 1, who is also the permanent vice-chairman of obas and chiefs in Lagos State. It is known to hold the country's oldest storey building.
Badagry is home to the Egun people who are predominantly fishermen.

Epe

Epe is a town located on the north side of the Lekki Lagoon. It is popular for the fishing activities attributed to the city. Per the 2006 Census the population of Epe was 181,409.

Epe is widely regarded as Lagos's fishing capital. Fishing is the main occupation of the people here, so it is no surprise that a sculpture of two giant fishes, erected at the Lekki-Epe T-Junction, welcomes you to Epe. The Epe Fish Market is regarded as Lagos's largest seafood market.

Epe town is well-known for its tranquilly. Aside from the adventure, sightseeing, and serenity, you also have access to low-cost animal protein.

Epe, like any other society, has special occasions and festivals where people come together to celebrate. Epe residents celebrate various festivals such as the Kayo-kayo festival, the Ebi bi festival, Ojude-Oba, and the Epe day.

Some campuses of popular higher education institutions in Lagos can be found within Epe. Lagos State University (LASU), Pan-Atlantic University (PAU), Yaba College of Technology, and Michael Otedola College of Primary Education are among them (MOCOPED).

Epe is also the birthplace of notable individuals such as former Lagos State Governor Akinwunmi Ambode and Nigerian businessman Femi Otedola.

Ojo

Ojo is a town mainly occupied by the Aworis with a population of 507,693. Lagos State University is in this town.

Economy
Lagos State is a major economic centre of Nigeria. It would be the fifth largest economy in Africa if it were a country.
Lagos State houses headquarters of most conglomerates and commercial banks in Nigeria.

Its total generated revenue in 2017 was around ₦334 billion (equivalent to US$920 million), growing by 10.43% compared to 2016. By the first half of 2021, the State's internally generated revenue (IGR) alone stood at over ₦267 billion.

Imota rice mill 

The Imota rice mill is an agricultural plant in Ikorodu, a suburb of Lagos, Nigeria. It was built in 2021 and will commence full production in the second quarter of 2022. The rice mill has a capacity to produce 2.8 million bags of 50 kg bags of rice yearly, while generating 1,500 direct jobs and 254,000 indirect jobs. On completion, in line with the estimated installed infrastructure of the facility, the production capacity of the rice mill in Imota will set it among the largest in the world, and the largest in sub-Saharan Africa.

According to Lagos State governor Sanwo-Olu, full production of the facility will drastically reduce prices of rice and pressure to purchase the commodity. At this moment (early 2022) Nigeria produces husk rice, yet imports hulled/polished rice at a higher price. Processing the national staple food rice in its own country therefore should improve Nigeria's trade balance.

Lekki Free Trade Zone 

Lekki Free Trade Zone (Lekki FTZ) is a free zone situated at the eastern part of Lekki, which covers a total area of about 155 square kilometres. The first phase of the zone has an area of 30 square kilometres, with about 27 square kilometres for urban construction purposes, which would accommodate a total resident population of 120,000. According to the Master Plan, the free zone will be developed into a new modern city within a city with integration of industries, commerce and business, real estate development, warehousing and logistics, tourism, and entertainment.

Mineral resources
The following mineral resources are found in Lagos State:
 Clay
 Bitumen
 Glass Sand

Infrastructure

Fourth Mainland Bridge 

The Fourth Mainland Bridge is a 38 km long bridge project by the Lagos State Government, connecting Lagos Island by way of  Langbasa(Lekki) and Baiyeku(Ikorodu) across the Lagos Lagoon to Itamaga, in Ikorodu. The bridge is a 2 x 4 lane carriageway cross-sectional road with permission for BRT Lane and future road contraction. It is expected to become the second longest Bridge in Africa, featuring 3 toll plazas, 9 interchanges, 4.5 km Lagoon Bridge and an eco-friendly environment amongst other added features.

In April 2021 there were 6 bidders for the US$2.5 billion project. By December the preferred bidder would be known.

In January 2022 the Lagos State Governor, Babajide Sanwo-Olu, reiterated the plan by the state government to commence the construction on the Opebi-Mende link bridge and the 38-kilometre 4th mainland bridge: "Construction work on the 38km 4th Mainland Bridge — which will be the longest in Africa — and the Opebi-Mende link bridge will commence this year."

Transportation

Transportation by air

Murtala Mohammed International Airport in Ikeja is one of Nigeria's five major international airports. It was built in 1978 and named after the former military head of state Late General Murtala Mohammed.

Lagos has also has the Lekki-Epe International Airport which is a proposed airport in Lekki, Nigeria, designed for a capacity of 5 million passengers annually.

Transportation by land

People can commute using by bus using the Lagos Bus Rapid Transit System, also known as Lagos BRT which is regulated by LAMATA.

Transportation by rail
The Lagos State Rail Mass Transit is an urban rail system which is under construction and should start operation by December 2022.

Government

Since its creation in 1967, the state has been administered either by a governor and a House of Assembly in civilian or quasi-civilian (under Ibrahim Badamasi Babangida's administration) federal administrations, or by Sole-Administrators or Military Administrators in military dispensations. Since December 2007, Yoruba has been the second official language of debate and discussion for the House of Assembly after English. The House of Assembly is headed by the Speaker, an elected position which is currently held by Mudashiru Obasa, who has also won his party's ticket to run for a 6th term in the upcoming 2023 elections.

Governor

The current governor of Lagos State is Mr. Babajide Sanwo-Olu, who emerged victorious in the March 9, 2019 Governorship elections.
Babajide Sanwo-Olu was sworn in on May 29, 2019, making him the 6th democratic governor of Lagos State and the 15th governor of Lagos State overall. On 18 May 2022, Lagos state government announced total ban on Okada in 6 local government areas of the state.

Politics 
The State government is led by a democratically elected governor who works closely with members of the state's house of assembly. The Capital city of the State is Ikeja.

Electoral System

The electoral system of each state is selected using a modified two-round system. To be elected in the first round, a candidate must receive the plurality of the vote and over 25% of the vote in at least two -third of the State local government Areas. If no candidate passes threshold, a second round will be held between the top candidate and the next candidate to have received a plurality of votes in the highest number of local government areas.

Administrative divisions

Local Government Areas

Lagos State is divided into five administrative divisions, which are further divided into 20 local government areas, or LGAs. They are:

The first 16 of the above LGAs comprise the statistical area of Metropolitan Lagos. The remaining four LGAs (Badagry, Ikorodu, Ibeju-Lekki and Epe) are within Lagos State but are not part of Metropolitan Lagos.

Local council development areas
In 2003, many of the existing 20 LGAs were split for administrative purposes into Local Council Development Areas. These lower-tier administrative units now number 56: Agbado/Oke-Odo, Agboyi/Ketu, Agege, Ajeromi, Alimosho, Apapa, Apapa-Iganmu, Ayobo/Ipaja, Badagry West, Badagry, Bariga, Coker Aguda, Egbe Idimu, Ejigbo, Epe, Eredo, Eti-Osa East, Eti Osa West, Iba, Isolo, Imota, Ikoyi, Ibeju, Ifako-Ijaiye, Ifelodun, Igando/Ikotun, Igbogbo/Bayeku, Ijede, Ikeja, Ikorodu North, Ikorodu West, Ikosi Ejinrin, Ikorodu, Ikorodu West, Iru/Victoria Island, Itire Ikate, Kosofe, Lagos Island West, Lagos Island East, Lagos Mainland, Lekki, Mosan/Okunola, Mushin, Odi Olowo/Ojuwoye, Ojo, Ojodu, Ojokoro, Olorunda, Onigbongbo, Oriade, Orile Agege, Oshodi, Oto-Awori, Shomolu, Surulere and Yaba.

Postal districts
This is a list of postal districts in Lagos State organised by local government area (LGA) and postal district, with postal codes also given.

Electoral wards
Below is a list of polling units, including villages and schools, organised by electoral ward.

Educational institutions

 Adeniran Ogunsanya College of Education
 Anchor University
 Augustine University Ilara, Epe
 Caleb University
 Federal College of Education, Akoka
 Federal College of Fisheries and Marine Technology
 Lagos Business School
 Lagos City Polytechnic
 Lagos State College of Health Technology
 Lagos State University of Science and Technology
 Lagos State University
 Lagos State University College of Medicine
 Michael Otedola College of Primary Education
 National Open University of Nigeria, Lagos study centres
 Nigerian Institute of Journalism, Ogba
 Pan Atlantic University
 University of Lagos
 Yaba College of Technology
 Adeniran Ogunsanya College of Education upgraded in 2022 now Lagos State University of Education

Tourism 

Lagos State has over 700 km of Atlantic sandy beaches with about 20 between the west of Badagry and east of Lekki. Along with these, there are several tourist attractions. They include:
 Atlas Cove, Apapa
 Bar Beach, Victoria Island
 Elegushi Beach
 Tarkwa Bay Beach
 Topo Island, Badagry.
 King Ado statue, Lagos Island 
 Tafawa Balewa Square

Demographics
While the state is essentially a Yoruba-speaking environment, it is a socio-cultural melting pot, attracting both Nigerians and foreigners alike.

Indigenous inhabitants include the Awori and Ogu  Egun in the Ikeja and Badagry Divisions respectively, with the Egun being found mainly in Badagry.

There is also an admixture of other pioneer settlers collectively known as the Eko.

The indigenous people of the Ikorodu and Epe Divisions are mainly the Ijebu, with pockets of Eko-Awori settlers along the coastland and riverine areas.
The dominant religions in Lagos State are Islam and Christianity although a certain amount of traditional religion is still practiced.

Environmental issues
 Water pollution
 Air pollution
 Waste
 Traffic congestion
 Noise pollution

Notable people

 Femi Ojo Ade, writer
 Kemi Adetiba, film maker
 Jimi Agbaje, politician
 Henry Ajomale, politician
 Rilwan Akiolu, Oba of Lagos
 Akinwunmi Ambode, accountant and politician
 Ayodele Awojobi, academic
 Segun Awosanya, advocate
 Muiz Banire, lawyer
 Basketmouth, comedian
 Henry Rawlingson Carr, educator
 G.B.A. Coker, former Judge of Supreme Court Of Nigeria
 Davido, musician
 Tony Elumelu, businessman
 Falz, singer
 Babatunde Fashola, politician
 Femi Gbajabiamila, politician
 Bode George, politician
 Adekunle Gold, singer
 Amy Jadesimi, businesswoman
 Oladipo Jadesimi, businessman
 Lateef Jakande, politician
 Mobolaji Johnson, military governor
 T. B. Joshua, Christian minister
 Fela Kuti, musician
 Mr Macaroni, comedian
 Herbert Macaulay, nationalist
 Musiliu Obanikoro, politician
 Hakeem Olajuwon, basketball player
 Babatunde Olatunji, musician
 Bruce Onobrakpeya, artist
 Oba Otudeko, businessman
 Jim Ovia, businessman
 Rahman Owokoniran, politician
 Babajide Sanwo-Olu, state Governor
 Toyin Saraki, healthcare philanthropist
 Wole Soyinka, writer
 Bola Tinubu, politician
 Efunroye Tinubu, aristocrat
 Oluremi Tinubu, politician
 Banky W., entertainer and politician
 Funsho Williams, politician
 Wizkid, musician

See also

 List of government ministries of Lagos State

References

Further reading
 
 Ajose, Sunny A. 2010. "The Evolution and Development of Lagos State Administration in Lagos State: A Sociological Approach."

External links

 Lagos State Government official site
 Lagos Interactive Maps & Sat Navs to travel around
 Lagos digital street maps
 Lagos State community website
 History and Cities in Lagos
 List of current local government area chairmen

 
States of Nigeria
States in Yorubaland
States and territories established in 1967
Coasts of Nigeria
1967 establishments in Nigeria